Katarzyna Strusińska, (born 23 November 1987 in Ciechanów, Poland), known professionally as Kasia Struss, is a Polish model.

Career
Struss was discovered in 2005 by a local talent scout after sending her pictures to a local Polish teen magazine. She went on to finish high school in her home town of Ciechanów before signing with an agency called Avant Management. Avant has been Kasia’s mother agency for over 10 years. Style.com ranked her as one of the top 10 newcomers of that season.

Struss has appeared in various magazines, including Vogue, Numéro, W, V, Dazed & Confused, and Ten Magazine.

She has walked the runway for Marc Jacobs, Viktor & Rolf, John Galliano, Versace, Kenzo, Diesel, DKNY, Burberry Prorsum, Louis Vuitton, Alessandro Dell'Acqua, Sonia Rykiel, Gareth Pugh, Julien Macdonald, Victoria's Secret and many more.  In 2007/2008, Struss opened shows for Nina Ricci, Dries Van Noten, Doo.Ri, Giambattista Valli, PHI, Costume National, Balenciaga, Yves Saint Laurent, Jil Sander, Sinha Stanic, Jill Stuart, Loewe, and Wunderkind, and closed shows for Jil Sander, Chloé, Giambattista Valli, Thakoon, Richard Chai, Christopher Kane, and Doo.Ri.
In the Spring/Summer fashion week 2010 she was the third most booked model, after Liu Wen and Constance Jablonski, who placed first and second respectively.

Struss has shot ad campaigns for Gucci, Dolce & Gabbana, Christian Dior, Valentino, Miu Miu, Hugo Boss, Costume National, Kenzo, Bottega Veneta, Alberta Ferretti, Chloé, Mulberry, Pringle of Scotland, Jil Sander, H&M, Express and Costume National.

Vogue Paris cited her in their "30 Models of the Decade".

She is currently considered an 'Industry Icon' on Models.com.

Personal life
She gave birth to a daughter, Alice, in August 2018.

References

External links
 Avant Management
 See Kasia Struss' GALLERY at www.avantmodels.pl
 
 Kasia Struss photos on style.com
 Kasia Struss ELLE Poland January 2023

1987 births
Living people
Polish female models
People from Ciechanów